Sweet Country is the sixteenth studio album by American country music artist Charley Pride. It was released in 1973 on the RCA Victor label (catalog no. APL1-0217).

The album debuted on the Billboard magazine's country album chart on June 23, 1973, peaked at the No. 3, and remained on the chart for a total of 39 weeks. The album also included the No. 1 hit singles: "Don't Fight the Feelings of Love" and "A Shoulder to Cry On".

It was awarded three stars from the web site AllMusic.

Track listing

See also
 Charley Pride discography

References

1973 albums
Charley Pride albums
albums produced by Jack Clement
RCA Records albums